Saving Jane is a band from Columbus, Ohio. The band is known for its song "Girl Next Door".  Lead singer is Marti Dodson.

History

2002-2008: Girl Next Door, One Girl Revolution and SuperGirl

Saving Jane's full-length debut, Girl Next Door, was issued in October 2005 on Toucan Cove. The title track on the album, also called "Girl Next Door", received major radio airplay following this release. This gained the attention of major record labels, and a contract with Republic/Universal Records, which helped them to make their debut on the Billboard charts. The single "Girl Next Door" peaked at No. 31 on the Billboard Hot 100. The video debuted on MTV's Total Request Live'''s countdown on April 24, 2006, at No. 9. The single "Come Down to Me" was released in late August and went on to sell over 100,000 copies.

In 2006, country singer Julie Roberts recorded a version of "Girl Next Door" which was released on her album Men and Mascara. (Saving Jane had released their own country remix of the song the previous winter, which was available on iTunes and got exposure on CMT and CMT.com.)

On August 7, 2007, Saving Jane's follow up album to Girl Next Door was released with the title One Girl Revolution.  A single with the same title debuted in the summer of 2007. The album, One Girl Revolution was released in 2007, with a re-release version with a new song, "SuperGirl" in the album, SuperGirl in 2008.

2009-2010: "Butterflies", Vampire Diaries EP, Psycho Ex-Girlfriend
A new song, "Butterflies" was released on iTunes in 2009. In early 2010, Saving Jane's new EP title, Vampire Diaries EP'' was released on January 26, 2010, on iTunes, it has three songs, "Immortal", "In Love With a Vampire" and "Immortal (Twilight Mix)".

On October 25, 2010, the single "Worst of Me" was released onto iTunes, which was part of the album, "Psycho Ex-Girlfriend" that was due for release in Spring 2011. However, the album was ultimately shelved.

Meanwhile, guitarist Pat Buzzard is working as a solo artist and released his first single in August 2008, a cover of Old Crow Medicine Show's "Wagon Wheel", which features Brandon Hagan on guitar, bass, banjo, backing vocals, and Marti Dodson on backing vocals.

Discography

Studio albums

Compilation albums

Extended plays

Singles

References

External links
Dodson, Marti; Where have all the cowboys (and Saving Jane records) gone? 

Musical groups established in 2002
Alternative rock groups from Ohio
Musical groups from Columbus, Ohio
2002 establishments in Ohio